NSB El 5 was an electric locomotive built by AEG, Norsk Elektrisk & Brown Boveri, Siemens, Hamar Jernstøperi and Thune between 1927 and 1936, with a total of 12 units being delivered to the Norwegian State Railways. They were capable of 1,044 kW and top speed of 70 km/h. Number 2039 is preserved by the Norwegian Railway Museum.

References
Jernbane.net entry on the El 5

El 05
AEG locomotives
Siemens locomotives
Brown, Boveri & Cie locomotives
15 kV AC locomotives
B-B locomotives
Rjukan Line
Electric locomotives of Norway
Railway locomotives introduced in 1927
Standard gauge locomotives of Norway